This is a list of filmmakers who appeared in Spaghetti Western films.

Notable personalities

Actors

 Mario Adorf
 Chelo Alonso
 Ángel Álvarez
 Leo Anchóriz
 Ursula Andress
 Tony Anthony
 R. G. Armstrong
 Tina Aumont
 Raf Baldassarre
 Brigitte Bardot
 Walter Barnes
 Rik Battaglia
 Femi Benussi
 Iris Berben
 William Berger
 Jack Betts
 Martine Beswick
 Erika Blanc
 José Bódalo
 Frank Braña
 Mario Brega
 Charles Bronson
 Lee Burton
 Yul Brynner
 José Calvo
 Claudia Cardinale
 Joseph Cotten
 Mark Damon
 Luis Dávila
 Alain Delon
 Clint Eastwood
 George Eastman
 Jack Elam
 Eduardo Fajardo
 Henry Fonda
 Franco Franchi
 Horst Frank
 Michael Forest
 Ida Galli
 Tito García
 Gianni Garko
 Giuliano Gemma
 Anthony Ghidra
 Leo Gordon
 Franco Graziosi
 Brett Halsey
 Ty Hardin
 Mickey Hargitay
 Richard Harrison
 Craig Hill
 Terence Hill
 George Hilton
 Robert Hossein
 Cris Huerta
 Robert Hundar
 Jeffrey Hunter
 Luis Induni
 Ciccio Ingrassia
 John Ireland
 Steve Kanaly
 Ella Karin
 Olga Karlatos
 Tony Kendall
 Klaus Kinski
 Marianne Koch
 Frank Latimore
 John Phillip Law
 Peter Lee Lawrence
 Friedrich von Ledebur
 Marco Leonardi
 Geoffrey Lewis
 Lo Lieh
 Helga Liné
 Lorella De Luca
 Piero Lulli
 Nicoletta Machiavelli
 Guy Madison
 Leonard Mann
 Peter Martell
 Conrado San Martín
 George Martin
 Jean Martin
 José Manuel Martín
 Elsa Martinelli
 Vonetta McGee
 Patrick McGoohan
 Toshiro Mifune
 Tomas Milian
 Gloria Milland
 Miou-Miou
 Soledad Miranda
 Cameron Mitchell
 Gordon Mitchell
 Antonio Molino Rojo
 Ricardo Montalbán
 Maria Monti
 Al Mulock
 Tatsuya Nakadai
 Nieves Navarro
 Rosalba Neri
 Franco Nero
 Alex Nicol
 Loredana Nusciak
 Donald O'Brien
 Jack Palance
 Luciana Paluzzi
 Mimmo Palmara
 Nello Pazzafini
 James Philbrook
 Luigi Pistilli
 Wayde Preston
 Edmund Purdom
 Anthony Quinn
 Giovanna Ralli
 Ivan Rassimov
 Rada Rassimov
 Lynn Redgrave
 Dean Reed
 Fernando Rey
 Burt Reynolds
 Jason Robards
 Lorenzo Robledo
 Giacomo Rossi Stuart
 Luciano Rossi
 Antoine Saint-John
 Enrico Maria Salerno
 Aldo Sambrell
 Conrado San Martín
 Pedro Sanchez
 Fernando Sancho
 Telly Savalas
 Charles Southwood
 Bud Spencer
 Ringo Starr
 Anthony Steffen
 Benito Stefanelli
 Rod Steiger
 Woody Strode
 José Suárez
 Fabio Testi
 Marilù Tolo
 Jean-Louis Trintignant
 Romolo Valli
 Lee Van Cleef
 Dan van Husen
 Pilar Velázquez
 Linda Veras
 Gian Maria Volonté
 Eli Wallach
 David Warbeck
 Patrick Wayne
 Orson Welles
 Frank Wolff
 Ken Wood
 Robert Woods
 Richard Wyler

Directors

 Alfonso Balcázar
 Gianfranco Baldanello
 Ferdinando Baldi
 Enzo Barboni
 Mario Bava
 Luigi Bazzoni
 Mario Bianchi
 Tanio Boccia
 Alfonso Brescia
 Mario Caiano
 Mario Camus
 Giorgio Capitani
 Alberto Cardone
 Giuliano Carnimeo
 Enzo G. Castellari
 Tonino Cervi
 Nando Cicero
 Giuseppe Colizzi
 Bruno Corbucci
 Sergio Corbucci
 Massimo Dallamano
 Damiano Damiani
 Alberto De Martino
 Giovanni Fago
 Giorgio Ferroni
 Demofilo Fidani
 Lucio Fulci
 Franco Giraldi
 Romolo Guerrieri
 Terence Hill
 Robert Hossein
 Ignacio F. Iquino
 León Klimovsky
 Umberto Lenzi
 Sergio Leone
 Carlo Lizzani
 Maurizio Lucidi
 Michele Lupo
 Antonio Margheriti
 Sergio Martino
 Bruno Mattei
 Domenico Paolella
 Gianfranco Parolini, often credited as Frank Kramer
 Giulio Petroni
 Giulio Questi
 Giancarlo Santi
 Leopoldo Savona
 Sergio Sollima
 Pasquale Squitieri
 Giorgio Stegani
 Duccio Tessari
 Tonino Valerii
 Florestano Vancini
 Giuseppe Vari
 Terence Young
 Primo Zeglio

Composers

 Luis Bacalov
 Stelvio Cipriani
 Guido & Maurizio De Angelis
 Francesco De Masi
 Gianni Ferrio
 Nico Fidenco
 Fabio Frizzi
 Marcello Giombini
 Coriolano Gori
 Lallo Gori
 Angelo Francesco Lavagnino
 Franco Micalizzi
 Ennio Morricone
 Bruno Nicolai
 Riz Ortolani
 Piero Piccioni
 Roberto Pregadio
 Gianfranco Reverberi
 Gian Piero Reverberi
 Carlo Rustichelli
 Carlo Savina
 Armando Trovajoli
 Piero Umiliani

References

External links
 The Spaghetti Western Database

Lists of actors
Lists of film directors
Lists of composers